The 24th Indiana Volunteer Infantry Regiment was an infantry regiment that served in the Union Army during the American Civil War.

Service
The 24th Indiana Volunteer Infantry was organized  at Vincennes, Indiana, on September 13, 1861.
Battle of Shiloh
Siege of Corinth
Battle of Port Gibson
Battle of Champion Hill
Siege of Vicksburg
Battle of Fort Blakely
The regiment mustered out of service on November 15, 1865.

Total strength and casualties
The regiment suffered 8 officers and 80 enlisted men killed in action or died of wounds and 3 officers and 204 enlisted men who died of disease, for a total of 295 fatalities.

Commanders
 Colonel Alvin Peterson Hovey
 Colonel William Thomas Spicely

See also

 List of Indiana Civil War regiments
 Indiana in the Civil War

Notes

References
The Civil War Archive - Indiana Units
Civil War - Indiana

Units and formations of the Union Army from Indiana
1861 establishments in Indiana
Military units and formations established in 1861
Military units and formations disestablished in 1865